Robert Schick (born 26 August 1993) is a German footballer who plays as a left-back for FC Bayern Alzenau.

Career

Schick played as a youth for several clubs in south-western Germany, before signing his first professional contract with FSV Frankfurt in 2012. He joined 3. Liga club Hallescher FC on loan for the 2013–14 season, and made his debut in August 2013, as a substitute for Tony Schmidt in a 2–0 win over SV Elversberg. After a year on loan at Halle, he signed for the club permanently.

In January 2015 his contract with Halle was dissolved and he moved to 2. Bundesliga side VfR Aalen.

References

External links

1993 births
Living people
German footballers
FSV Frankfurt players
Hallescher FC players
VfR Aalen players
VfL Wolfsburg II players
3. Liga players
Regionalliga players
People from Main-Taunus-Kreis
Sportspeople from Darmstadt (region)
Association football fullbacks
Footballers from Hesse